Billy Yakuba Ouattara (born January 24, 1992 in Tepa, Ghana) is a Ghanaian-French professional basketball player for AS Monaco of the LNB Pro A and EuroLeague.

Professional career
Ouattara first began his professional career out in France with the Élan Chalon of the LNB Pro A in 2012 as a 20-year-old. He played with that team for two seasons before signing a one-year deal with the ASC Denain-Voltaire PH, who were a part of the LNB Pro B at that time. During that year, he helped the team make it to the LNB Pro B Finals before ultimately losing the series to Hyères-Toulon Var Basket. On July 24, 2015, Ouattara signed with the AS Monaco Basket out in Monaco, returning to the Pro A that year. During his second season at Monaco, Ouattara was named a French Pro A All-Star and helped Monaco win the Leaders Cup Championship over the ASVEL Basket in 2017.

Ouattara signed a two-way contract with the Brooklyn Nets of the NBA on July 21, 2017, becoming the first foreign born player to sign a two-way deal with an NBA team. Under the terms of the deal, he would have planned to split time between the Brooklyn Nets and their G League affiliate, the Long Island Nets, with a majority of his time being spent with the Long Island affiliate team. However, due to injury problems throughout the year, he would never get a chance to play with the Brooklyn Nets squad, having only played in one G League game with the Long Island Nets during that time. On December 17, 2017, Ouattara was waived by the Nets. On January 17, 2018, Ouattara was reacquired by the Long Island Nets.

On March 30, 2018, Ouattara signed for the remainder of the 2017–18 season with Monaco.

On July 17, 2020, he signed with Coosur Real Betis of the Liga ACB.

On July 20, 2021, he signed with AS Monaco of the French LNB Pro A. AS Monaco also plays in the EuroLeague

National team career
Because of the unavailability of a Ghanaian national team, he has been a member of the French national team.

References

External links
 NBADraft.net profile
 Eurobasket.com profile
 basketball-reference.com profile

1992 births
Living people
AS Monaco Basket players
Black French sportspeople
Denain Voltaire Basket players
Élan Chalon players
Expatriate basketball people in Monaco
Ghanaian expatriate sportspeople in Monaco
Ghanaian expatriate sportspeople in the United States
Ghanaian men's basketball players
French expatriate basketball people in the United States
French expatriate sportspeople in Monaco
French men's basketball players
French sportspeople of Ghanaian descent
Liga ACB players
Long Island Nets players
People from Tepa, Ghana
Real Betis Baloncesto players
Shooting guards